Zhang Yaoguang (born 21 June 1993) is a Chinese athlete specialising in the long jump. He won a silver medal at the 2018 Asian Games. In addition, he won a gold medal at the 2016 Asian Indoor Championships.

His personal bests in the event are 8.29 metres outdoors (+0.4 m/s, Guiyang 2018) and 8.12 metres indoors (Xianlin 2017).

Competition record

References

1993 births
Living people
Chinese male long jumpers
Athletes (track and field) at the 2018 Asian Games
Asian Games medalists in athletics (track and field)
Asian Games silver medalists for China
Medalists at the 2018 Asian Games
21st-century Chinese people